Gotthelf is a given name and a surname. Notable people with the name include:

Given name:
Gotthelf Bergsträsser (1886–1933), German linguist specializing in Semitic studies
Esriel Gotthelf Carlebach (1909–1956), journalist during the early days of the state of Israel
Carl Gotthelf Gerlach (1704–1761), German organist, took over the Leipzig Collegium Musicum from J S Bach
Ernst Gotthelf Gersdorf (1804–1874), German librarian, most notable for his work at the Leipzig University Library
Gotthelf Greiner (1732–1797), German glassmaker
Ferdinand Gotthelf Hand (1786–1851), German classical scholar
Karl Gotthelf von Hund (1722–1776), German freemason
Abraham Gotthelf Kästner (1719–1800), German mathematician and epigrammatist
Julius Gotthelf Kühn or Julius Kühn (1825–1910), German academic and agronomist
Karl Gotthelf Lehmann (1812–1863), German physiological chemist
Johann Gotthelf Lindner (1729–1776), German university teacher and writer
Wilhelm Gotthelf Lohrmann (1796–1840), Saxon cartographer, astronomer, meteorologist and patron of the sciences
Ernst Gustav Gotthelf Marcus (1893–1968), German zoologist at University of São Paulo
Burkhard Gotthelf Struve (1671–1738), scholarly German librarian at the University of Jena
Gotthelf Fischer von Waldheim (1771–1853), German and Russian anatomist, entomologist and paleontologist

Surname:
Allan Gotthelf (1942–2013), American philosopher and scholar
Jeremias Gotthelf (1797–1854), pen name of Swiss novelist Albert Bitzius
Michael Gotthelf (born 1953), German journalist and banker

See also